Ioannis Petrou (born 10 August 1996 in Thessaloniki) is a Greek competitive rower.

He competed at the 2016 Summer Olympics in Rio de Janeiro, in the men's lightweight coxless four, finishing in the 6th place.

References

1996 births
Living people
Greek male rowers
Olympic rowers of Greece
Rowers at the 2016 Summer Olympics
Rowers from Thessaloniki